Osey Ramulamma is a 1997 Indian Telugu-language action drama film written and directed by Dasari Narayana Rao. The film is based on a woman's rebellion in Telangana and stars Vijayashanti as the title character. Rao and Rami Reddy also star while Krishna makes a cameo appearance. The film premiered at the 1998 International Film Festival of India in the mainstream section.

Plot 
Ramulamma is born into the Dalit caste, making her an "untouchable", in the village. At the age of 13, she is impregnated by the Dora, Jagannayak Patwari. After giving birth to the baby, Patwari learns of its existence. He orders his men to throw the baby away and kill Ramulamma. The baby is found by Naxalites and raised by them. Injured, Ramulamma is taken care of, by a Dalit couple, who treat her as their sister. They live in a typical feudal village in Telangana, where the Doralu (feudal lords), exploit peasants in the name of bonded labour and debts. Ramulamma is asked to work at the palace of the Dora, as a maid for the Dorasani, the wife of the Dora.

One day, Patwari's son attempts to rape Ramulamma. She kills him in his bed. Learning of this, Patwari tries to kill Ramulamma, but she is rescued by Komaranna, a naxalite leader, and is taken to the forest, where Komaranna and the other naxalites live.

She learns their ideology, begins to believe in it, and gradually becomes the leader, after Komaranna steps down. Meanwhile, Ramulamma's son is killed by Patwari. CBI officer, Krishna, who was sent by the Central Government to look into the Naxalite issue, convinces Ramulamma and Komaranna to surrender. But later, he finds that the central government is corrupt and that the Doras are ruling it. He learns that Ramulamma is to be killed by the Dora. He helps Ramulamma escape from jail, but Komaranna and he die in the gunfight with the police. Ramullama finally kills Patwari, in front of the whole village.

Cast 
 Vijayashanti  – Ramulamma
 Dasari Narayana Rao – Komranna
 Rami Reddy – Landlord Jagannayak Patwari
 Narra Venkateswara Rao – Ramaswamy
 Sakunthala – Ramaswamy's wife
 Saraswati Narra
 Ashok Kumar – Landlord's son
 Suthivelu
Krishna as Krishna Mohan(cameo appearance)
Ramki (cameo appearance)

Soundtrack 
The music was composed by Vandemataram Srinivas. Srinivas gained Nandi award and Filmfare south award for his work. The songs (except two) were sung by him.

Reception 
The film was reviewed by Zamin Ryot. A critic from Andhra Today wrote that "A big hit for the dashing, dare-devil heroine Vijayashanti after a long time is Ose Ramulamma".

Awards 
1997 – Vandemataram Srinivas won the Nandi Award for Best Music Director and the Filmfare Award for Best Music Director – Telugu.
1997 – Vijayashanti won the Nandi Award for Best Actress and the Filmfare Award for Best Actress – Telugu.

References

External links 
 

1990s action drama films
1990s feminist films
1990s Telugu-language films
1997 films
Films about women in India
Films directed by Dasari Narayana Rao
Films scored by Vandemataram Srinivas
Indian action drama films
Indian feminist films